The 2010 Danish Cup Final was the final and deciding match of the 2009-10 Danish Cup tournament. It took place on Thursday 13 May 2010 at Parken Stadium in Copenhagen. It was contested between first-time finalists FC Nordsjælland, and FC Midtjylland who had lost their two earlier finals. Nicolai Vollquartz refereed the match in front of a crowd of 18,856.

FC Nordsjælland won the match 2-0 by two extra time goals by Nicolai Stokholm and Bajram Fetai, securing the club their first cup title. The Cup-fighter-award was handed to Nicolai Stokholm.

Road to the Final

 FC Midtjylland entered the tournament in the third round.
 Square brackets [ ] represent the opposition's division.

Match details

References

External links
Official match program by Danish Football Association
POKAL 2009/2010 --- FINALE at Haslund.info

Danish Cup Finals
Danish Cup Final 2010
Danish Cup Final 2010
Cup
May 2010 sports events in Europe
Sports competitions in Copenhagen
2010 in Copenhagen